Stevan Faddy (born 2 September 1986, in Kotor) is a Montenegrin musician. He took part in Montevizija 2005, with "Utjeha". He also participated in Sunčane Skale 2003 singing "Poslednja obala". On 25 February 2007, he won a landslide victory in MontenegroSong 2007 with his song "Ajde Kroči" and won a ticket to represent Montenegro in the Eurovision Song Contest 2007 held in Helsinki, Finland. Stevan was the first singer representing Montenegro after its independence. He is currently living in Podgorica, Montenegro.

Music career 
His first attempt to enter Eurovision came in Evropesma 2005, with "Utjeha". He won second place at Montevizija and fourth in the finals.

At Montevizija in 2006, Faddy took first place with the song "Cipele," notably ahead of previous Evropesma winners No Name. At the finals, Faddy finished third.

On 25 February 2007, he won a landslide victory in MontenegroSong 2007 with his song "Ajde Kroči" and won a ticket to represent Montenegro in the Eurovision Song Contest 2007 held in Helsinki, Finland. He would fail to qualify for the final finishing a-joint 22nd along with Estonia in the competition's semifinal with 33 points.

Discography

Singles 
 Posljednja obala (Sunčane Skale 2003)
 Utjeha (Montevizija 2005 / Europjesma 2005)
 Cipele (Montevizija 2006 / Europjesma 2006)
 'Ajde, Kroči (MontenegroSong 2007 / Eurovision Song Contest 2007)
 Dobri ljudi (2008)

Albums 
 I to je sve... (TBD)

References

1986 births
Living people
People from Kotor
Eurovision Song Contest entrants for Montenegro
Eurovision Song Contest entrants of 2007
Montenegrin people of Scottish descent
21st-century Montenegrin male singers